Phlegra karoo is a jumping spider species in the genus Phlegra. It was first identified by Wanda Wesołowska in 2006 and lives in Namibia, South Africa and Zimbabwe.

References

Salticidae
Arthropods of Namibia
Arthropods of Zimbabwe
Spiders of Africa
Spiders of South Africa
Spiders described in 2006
Taxa named by Wanda Wesołowska